Clear Creek is a tributary of the Hocking River. It starts in western Fairfield County and flows southwest into northern Hocking County. In the upper half of the creek's watershed was glaciated and currently has a large amount of agricultural land use. The lower half is part of the unglaciated Allegheny Plateau and is much more forested. The creek's mouth is found at

Variant names
According to the Geographic Names Information System, the Clear Creek has also been known as Clear Fork.

See also
List of rivers of Ohio

References

Rivers of Ohio
Rivers of Fairfield County, Ohio
Rivers of Hocking County, Ohio